Tyin is a lake in Vang Municipality in Innlandet county, Norway. The lake is located in the southwest part of the Jotunheimen mountain range. The lake lies in Vang Municipality in Innlandet county, but a small portion of the lake extends into Årdal Municipality in Vestland county. The western border mostly follows the border between Vang and Årdal, but there are some areas where the lake crosses over the boundary.

The Norwegian County Road 53 runs along the south side of the lake (Tyin–Årdal) and the Norwegian County Road 252 runs along the east side of the lake (Tyin–Eidsbugarden) and both roads connect to the European route E16 highway to the south.

In 1869, the Norwegian Mountain Touring Association (DNT) built its first cabin, which was located on the shores of Tyin. Today, the DNT's tourist cabins make this area, just to the south of Jotunheim National Park, one of the best developed touring areas in Europe. There are also a restricted number of private cabins by the lake.

Name
The name of the lake is derived from the name of the river Tya, the river that connects the lake to Årdalsvatnet and the Sognefjord. The meaning of the river name is unknown.

Media gallery

See also
 Tyin Hydroelectric Power Station
 List of lakes in Norway

References

Vang, Innlandet
Årdal
Lakes of Innlandet
Lakes of Vestland
Reservoirs in Norway